In telecommunications, spectral component is any of the waves that range outside the interval of frequencies assigned to a signal. Any waveform can be disassembled into its spectral components by Fourier analysis or Fourier transformation. The length of a pulse thereby is detesitions (spectral phase) of these spectral components.

See also
 Spectral width
 Bandwidth-pulse

Telecommunications
Fourier analysis